The Good Witch is a television film that aired on the Hallmark Channel on January 19, 2008. It stars Catherine Bell as Cassandra "Cassie" Nightingale and Chris Potter as chief of police Jake Russell. The film has spawned a franchise of six followup television films and the television series Good Witch.

Plot
The town of Middleton is shaken up the arrival of the mysterious, beautiful Cassandra "Cassie" Nightingale, who has moved into Grey House—an old, abandoned building supposedly haunted by its former owner and Cassie's ancestor Elizabeth Merriwick, known as "The Grey Lady."  Martha Tinsdale, wife of Middleton's mayor, demands that Police Chief Jake Russell investigate reports of a woman occupying the house; together, they meet Cassie, who answers questions evasively but makes clear she is the home's owner and resident.  Later, a dog, Attila, chases Jake's children Brandon and Lori on their way home from school.  They end up at Grey House, where Lori falls and scrapes her knee.  Cassie appears and Attila leaves in response to her verbal admonishment.  Cassie invites the children inside and tends to Lori's knee with an herbal poultice.  Attila's owner Rusty complains to Jake that his guard dog has become completely docile, so Jake meets with Cassie, quickly establishing that the entire incident occurred on Cassie's property, negating Rusty's complaint.  He is surprised to learn that she has met his children.  She invites him to visit her at Grey House or the shop she plans to open on Main Street.  Meanwhile, Brandon's classmate Kyle threatens Brandon and Lori, demanding Brandon's lunch money.  Jake's wife died three years earlier; Brandon has become surly and withdrawn, while Lori has nightmares.  Lori asks Cassie about stopping the nightmares; Cassie gives her a dreamcatcher and uses reverse psychology to get her to dream about bunnies instead.

Cassie opens her shop, "Bell, Book, & Candle," specializing in herbs and curiosities.  She sells an aphrodisiac essential oil to a woman named Nancy; Nancy and her husband, who had experienced infertility, successfully conceive.  Martha believes Cassie's wares are associated with witchcraft.  After Martha falls over a display while recoiling from the merchandise, she accuses Cassie of assault.  Jake goes to see Cassie and learns she has hired Walter Cobb, a homeless alcoholic, to assist in renovations while living onsite.  Jake declines to file charges, concluding Martha's fall was accidental, displeasing Martha's husband, Mayor Tom Tinsdale, who demands Jake run a background check on Cassie.  When Jake finds no record of a "Cassandra Nightingale," she admits that she ran away from foster care after her parents died in a car crash.  He asks her to dinner and she accepts.

Brandon and Lori are now convinced Cassie is a "good witch" who can perform magic.  Brandon asks Cassie for help with Kyle, and she agrees to turn him into "something less threatening," but sets conditions that require Brandon to spend time with Kyle.  Brandon learns Kyle steals money to placate his abusive father; Brandon confides the situation to Jake, who promises to help; Kyle goes to live with his grandmother, out of town, where Jake believes Kyle will be "all right."  Jake's father-in-law, George, introduces himself to Cassie due to her increasing involvement with his family.  She quickly befriends him and convinces him to fulfil his lifelong ambition of visiting his ancestral homeland of Ireland.  Martha rouses a group of townspeople against Cassie, for her supposed practice of "dark arts" and her association with Walter Cobb.  Martha gathers signatures to revoke Cassie's business license, and Cassie cancels the dinner to avoid any conflict of interest for Jake.  But at George's urging, Jake goes to see her and finds she has already prepared an intimate dinner for them to enjoy at Grey House.  She reveals her given name, "Sue Ellen Brock," and Jake acknowledges that her chosen name suits her better.

Cassie hosts a Halloween party, but most of the townspeople stay away.  Jake's family attend, as do Walter, Nancy and her husband, and Kyle.  Cassie believes Martha will succeed in driving her out of town, but Jake urges her to change her mindset of "running away."  Jake's deputy, Derrick, catches Martha's sons Michael and Dylan vandalizing Cassie's shop.  Cassie refuses to press charges, and Tom demands Martha drop her destructive vendetta.  Tom orders his sons to work off their debt to Cassie.  Jake and Cassie tease each other over a broom that inexplicably appears in the shop.

Cast and characters
 Catherine Bell as Cassandra "Cassie" Nightingale. A mysterious woman who moves into Grey House. She seems to have multiple strange abilities, the extent and origin of which are mostly unknown. These include communicating with animals, and suddenly appearing out of nowhere. Born Sue-Ellen Brook, Cassie's parents died in a car crash when she was a child, and she was raised in foster care. Cassie has a shop in Middleton called Bell, Book & Candle, where she sells various curious objects. Towards the end of the film she begins a relationship with Police Chief Jake Russell.
 Chris Potter as Chief of Police Jake Russell. Jake is the father of Brandon and Lori. Since the death of his wife Jennifer three years ago, he gets help raising them by his father-in-law George. Since his wife's death he has become overly protective of his children. Jake is fascinated by Cassie, but as opposed to her intuitive decision-making, he relies mainly on facts. Toward the end of the film, the two begin a relationship.
 Catherine Disher as Martha Tinsdale, a strong willed member of city council. Martha is afraid of Cassie ruining the good image of Middleton, as the town is looking for new investors. Convinced that Cassie practices Black Magic, she petitions for the shop to be closed.
 Peter MacNeill as George O'Hanrahan, Brandon and Lori's maternal grandfather and father-in-law of Jake, who assists him in looking after the kids after the death of his daughter Jennifer.
 Allan Royal as Walter Cobb
 Matthew Knight as Brandon Russell. The son of Jennifer and Jake Russell. Brandon spends his free time playing video games. He cares for his younger sister, despite often being annoyed by her. He gets bullied by Kyle in school, but after learning that Kyle comes from an abusive home, the two boys become friends. Brandon tells his father about the abuse, and helps get his friend away from the situation.
 Paula Boudrea as Nancy, also a member of city council. Nancy buys a perfume in Bell, Book & Candle that increases her husband's attraction to her. At the end of the film, she is revealed to be pregnant, after having tried for a long time. She befriends Cassie and makes some effort to defend her.
 Hannah Endicott-Douglas as Lori Russell, Jake's youngest child. Since her mother's death, she has been haunted by nightmares about monsters. She receives a dreamcatcher from Cassie and is told not to dream of bunnies, which makes her nightmares disappear.
 Jesse Bostick as Kyle, a boy who bullied Brandon out of jealousy because of his abusive father and his mother who abandoned him. After seeing someone brave enough to confront him Kyle befriends Brandon after changing his ways. His father is arrested for child abuse and he goes to live with his grandmother.
 Noah Cappe as Deputy Derek Sanders, a laid back and easygoing police officer. In addition to Jake being his boss, the two men are also friends. Derek is surprised when he first sees Cassie, as she does not look like the witch townspeople have called her.
 Paul Miller as Tom Tinsdale, Mayor of Middleton and Martha's husband.
 Nathan McLeod as Michael Tinsdale, son of Martha and Tom Tinsdale.

Production
Although set in Middleton, USA, it was filmed in Hamilton, Cambridge and Niagara-on-the-Lake, in Ontario, Canada. In the sequel, The Good Witch's Charm, the map on the wall in the police station shows Middleton located southwest of Chicago, in the vicinity of DuPage County. The names of the suburbs and interstates that are west of Chicago can be clearly seen.

In S2E8 of the original series, Sam’s friend Doug refers to Middleton as “up this far North of Chicago.”

Promotion and release
On January 15, 2008, Hallmark Channel and Limbo, the mobile entertainment community, teamed up to create and launch the cable network's first-ever mobile interactive initiative. The campaign "enhanced viewers' experience of the premiere of the network's original movie ... through 'Limbo Unique' – a game played via cell phone or online". The grand prize was $2,000 and a portrait of the "Grey Lady" that was featured in the movie.

Home media
The Good Witch (Region 1) DVD was released on January 5, 2010. The Good Witch Collection (Region 1) DVD was released October 14, 2014.

Reception
The movie had great success on Hallmark Channel on the night of its premiere, making it the second-highest-rated original movie to that date. It premiered with a 3.8 HH (household) rating and was in nearly 3.2 million homes. It also was #1 in its time period, propelling the channel to the #4 spot in weekly ranking.

Film series
In addition to the original television movie, the Hallmark Channel has aired six followup television films.

Television series

In February 2014, the Hallmark Channel announced that Good Witch had been green-lighted for a ten-episode series, starring Catherine Bell, to premiere on February 28, 2015. Production for the first season began on October 29, 2014, in Toronto, with Sue Tenney as showrunner. Bailee Madison and James Denton also star. The series ran for seven seasons, concluding on July 25, 2021.

References

External links
 The Good Witch at Hallmark Channel
 The Good Witch Movies on Hallmark Channel
 

 
2008 television films
2008 films
American fantasy films
Canadian fantasy films
Canadian television films
English-language Canadian films
Films shot in Hamilton, Ontario
Hallmark Channel original films
Films about witchcraft
Films directed by Craig Pryce
2000s American films
2000s Canadian films